Mark Cisneros is an American politician and businessman serving as a member of the Iowa House of Representatives from the 91st district. Elected in November 2020, he assumed office on January 11, 2021.

Early life 
The son of immigrants from Mexico, Cisneros was raised in Los Angeles County, California.

Career 
He began his career with the Los Angeles Park Ranger Division. Cisneros and his wife relocated from Los Angeles to Muscatine, Iowa in 2008. He has since owned and operated two retail stores with his wife and worked in the trucking industry. He was elected to the Iowa House of Representatives in November 2020 and assumed office on January 11, 2021. He is the vice chair of the House Commerce Committee. When Cisneros assumed office, he became the first member of the Iowa House of Hispanic heritage.

References

External links

Living people
Republican Party members of the Iowa House of Representatives
People from Los Angeles
People from Los Angeles County, California
People from Muscatine, Iowa
Hispanic and Latino American state legislators
21st-century American politicians
American politicians of Mexican descent
Year of birth missing (living people)